William S. (Bill) Beaton (August 19, 1896 – April 1, 1956) was a Canadian politician, who was the 22nd mayor of the City of Sudbury, Ontario. He was elected to office in 1941 and was elected to office a record 11 times.  An avid amateur athlete, Beaton was heavily involved in the city's amateur sporting events and as such the annual Beaton Classic was named in his honor.

Beaton is credited the elimination of the city's streetcar system, and the construction of the Sudbury Arena.

Beaton also ran as an Ontario Liberal Party candidate in Sudbury in the 1948 provincial election, but lost that election to Welland Gemmell.

After a decade as mayor, Beaton was defeated in 1952 by Dan Jessup, a local businessmen.

The 1950 Municipal Election
The municipal election of 1950 represented the start of a key shift in the demographic of city council.  It was in this election that citizens of Sudbury elected two women to serve as alderman for the first time in the city's history.  They were Grace Hartman and Dr. Faustina Kelly Cook.  Although Beaton was successful in this his eleventh election, this would mark the start of a turn of events that would lead to the end of the Beaton dynasty.

On an interesting side note, Beaton also ran against Peter Fenton, the Mayor of the City of Sudbury from 1930 to 1932.

The view the full results see: Sudbury municipal election, 1950.

Books
 Dorian, Charles (1961). The First 75 Years, A Headline History of Sudbury, Canada. Arthur H. Stockwell Limited, Ilfracombe, Devon.
 Wallace, C. M.; & Thomson, Ashley (Eds.) (1993). Sudbury: Rail Town to Regional Capital (3rd ed.). Dundram Press Limited. .

References

Mayors of Sudbury, Ontario
1896 births
1956 deaths
People from East Gwillimbury
Ontario Liberal Party candidates in Ontario provincial elections